The Attorney General of the Republic for Mersin (Turkish: Mersin Cumhuriyet Başsavcılığı) is the office of the chief prosecutor responsible for the Turkish city of Mersin. The Attorney General is accompanied by several prosecutors, but the Supreme Board of Judges and Prosecutors (HSYK) can vote on the recommendation of the Ministry of Justice to assign Deputy Attorneys General to the city of Mersin to aid the sitting Attorney General if necessary.

Functions and responsibilities

Office
The Office of the Attorney General of Mersin has the following functions and responsibilities.
To make inquiries and pursue investigations into whether to open a public trial
To observe legal proceedings on behalf of the public and resort to legal remedies when necessary
To implement and observe finalised court orders

Office-holder
The Attorney General of Mersin has the following functions and responsibilities.
To represent the Office of the Attorney General of Mersin
To ensure that the Office of the Attorney General works in an efficient manner on a regular basis and to assign roles to other officials
To perform the tasks required by the judicial office, to attend the hearings and to resort to legal remedies
To perform other duties assigned by law

See also
Governor (Turkey)
Judiciary of Turkey

References

External links
Constitution of Turkey

Attorneys General in Turkey